CATS Warrior is a part of the HAL Combat Air Teaming System program. Its work is believed to have started in early 2019 under a Public Private Partnership (PPP) between the state owned HAL and an Indian private startup Newspace R&D. HAL has done an initial investment of ₹400 crore in CATS Warriors & in Aero India 2021 a full-scale mock-up model was presented for the first time.

Development 

CATS Warrior will be an autonomous wingman drone capable of take off & landing from land & in sea from an aircraft carrier, it will team up with the existing fighter platforms of the IAF like Tejas, Su-30 MKI and Jaguar which will act like its mothership.
The Warrior is primarily envisioned for the Indian Air Force use and a similar, smaller version will be designed for the Indian Navy. It would be controlled by the mothership and accomplish tasks such as scouting, absorbing enemy fire, attacking the targets if necessary with its internal & external pylons weapons or sacrifice itself by crashing into the target. 

It will fly back for mission within the combat radius of 350 km and for long range mission with combat radius of 800 km it will sacrifice itself crashing into the target. As it is an unmanned asset, it can be directed towards a target and sacrificed in case it cannot be flown back to territory.
"Warrior will serve as a 'sensor amplifier' for the LCA, flying out ahead of the manned aircraft and using its sensors to feed information back to LCA" HAL test pilot Retd Group Captain H.V. Thakur 

HAL management approved a sum of ₹390 Crore ($53.5 Million) for the development as of February 2021. As per Director of HAL Engineering, Research & Development division Arup Chatterjee, the integration with CATS MAX mothership will take 1-2 years and first flights is scheduled for 2024-25.

Design 

It has a composite structure with an internal weapon bay & hybrid design whose front section looks like Boeing Airpower Teaming System wingman & from its mid fuselage to its tail like Kratos XQ-58 Valkyrie. It has a single serpentine air intake on the top of its fuselage that leads to its two engines. It will be powered by modified HAL PTAE-7 or HAL HTFE-25 turbofan engine.

It can carry two new-generation short-range or beyond-visual-range air-to-air missiles externally, and two DRDO Smart Anti-Airfield Weapon (SAAW) internally in its internal weapon bay.

It will be equipped with an electro-optic/infrared payload, Active electronically scanned array (AESA) radar, inertial navigational unit, and a jammer for intelligence, surveillance, and reconnaissance and combat operations.

Its exhaust will feature chevron nozzle design like Lockheed Martin F-35 Lightning II to reduce the Jet blast noises & radar emissions.

Projected specifications

See also 

Boeing Airpower Teaming System
List of unmanned aerial vehicles
Kratos XQ-58 Valkyrie

References 

Unmanned aerial vehicle manufacturers